The 1997–98 NBA season was the Bulls' 32nd season in the National Basketball Association. The Bulls entered the season as the two-time defending NBA champions, and in the Finals, they met the Utah Jazz in a rematch from the prior year's NBA Finals and just like that year, they would go on to defeat the Jazz in six games to win their sixth championship in eight years and complete the franchise's second "3-peat".
During the off-season, the Bulls acquired Scott Burrell from the Golden State Warriors, and signed free agent Joe Kleine. However, All-Star forward Scottie Pippen would miss the first half of the season due to an injured toe on his left foot sustained from the 1997 NBA Playoffs. Without Pippen, the Bulls started with a slow 9–7 record in November, but then would go on a 15–4 record until he returned in January. However, three-point specialist Steve Kerr went down with a knee injury in January, and only played just 50 games. Despite the injuries, the Bulls held a 34–15 record at the All-Star break. At midseason, the team traded Jason Caffey to the Golden State Warriors in exchange for David Vaughn. Vaughn would only play just three games with the Bulls before being waived on March 2. Also in early March, the team re-signed former Bulls reserve forward Dickey Simpkins, who was previously released by the Warriors, and played in the final 21 games of the regular season. Despite the slow start, with the help of Scottie's return which was limited to just 44 games, the Bulls would post a 13-game winning streak between March and April, and still finish first place in the Central Division and Eastern Conference with a 62–20 record. The Bulls had the third best team defensive rating in the NBA.

In the playoffs, the Bulls swept the New Jersey Nets, 3–0 in the Eastern Conference First Round, defeated the Charlotte Hornets, 4–1 in the Eastern Conference Semi-finals, despite losing Game 2 at the United Center, 78–76, and then defeated the Indiana Pacers, 4–3 in the Eastern Conference Finals en route to advance to the NBA Finals. In the Finals, they met the Utah Jazz in a rematch from the prior year's NBA Finals and just like last year, they would go on to defeat the Jazz in six games to win the championship. The championship was their sixth in eight years and completed the franchise's second "3-peat".

The season also saw Michael Jordan earn his fifth and final NBA Most Valuable Player Award, while being selected for the 1998 NBA All-Star Game, where he also won his third and final All-Star Game MVP Award. He once again led the league in scoring averaging 28.7 points, 5.8 rebounds and 1.7 steals per game, while being named to the All-NBA First Team, and NBA All-Defensive First Team, and also finished in fourth place in Defensive Player of the Year voting. In addition, Pippen averaged 19.1 points, 5.2 rebounds, 5.8 assists and 1.8 steals per game, and was selected to the All-NBA Third Team, and also to the All-Defensive First Team, while finishing in tenth place in Most Valuable Player voting, and rebound-specialist Dennis Rodman once again led the league in rebounding with 15.0 rebounds per game. Toni Kukoč provided the team with 13.3 points per game, playing most of the season as the team's starting small forward in Pippen's absence, while Luc Longley averaged 11.4 points and 5.9 rebounds per game, Ron Harper contributed 9.3 points and 1.3 steals per game, and Kerr contributed 7.5 points per game off the bench.

This was Jordan's last season as a Bull, as he announced his second retirement after it was over. However, he did make a second comeback with the Washington Wizards in 2001. Following the season, Phil Jackson resigned as head coach, while Pippen was traded to the Houston Rockets, Rodman left for the Los Angeles Lakers as a free agent, Longley was dealt to the Phoenix Suns, Kerr signed with the San Antonio Spurs, Burrell signed with the New Jersey Nets, Jud Buechler signed with the Detroit Pistons, and Kleine re-signed with the Suns, his former team.

Because of this dismantling of the team, this was the last season for the Bulls dynasty that had headlined the NBA throughout the 1990s. What followed was a long rebuilding process between 1998 and 2004, and the Bulls did not return to the postseason until 2005.

The story of this season was captured in ESPN's The Last Dance. It aired in April 2020, expedited due to the COVID-19 pandemic.

Offseason

NBA draft

Roster

Roster Notes
 Power forward David Vaughn was waived on March 2.

Regular season

Season standings

Record vs. opponents

October-November

December

January

February

March

April

Game log

Regular season

|- style="background:#fcc;"
| 1
| October 31
| @ Boston
| L 85–92
| Michael Jordan (30)
| Dennis Rodman (9)
| Harper & Jordan (4)
| FleetCenter18,624
| 0–1

|- style="background:#cfc;"
| 2
| November 1
| Philadelphia
| W 94–74
| Ron Harper (17)
| Dennis Rodman (13)
| Ron Harper (8)
| United Center24,196
| 1–1
|- style="background:#cfc;"
| 3
| November 3
| San Antonio
| W 87–83 (OT)
| Michael Jordan (29)
| Dennis Rodman (22)
| Jordan & Harper (4)
| United Center23,868
| 2–1
|- style="background:#cfc;"
| 4
| November 5
| Orlando
| W 94–81
| Michael Jordan (29)
| Michael Jordan (17)
| Steve Kerr (5)
| United Center23,809
| 3–1
|- style="background:#fcc;"
| 5
| November 7
| @ Atlanta
| L 78–80
| Michael Jordan (27)
| Jordan & Longley (9)
| Michael Jordan (6)
| Georgia Dome45,790
| 3–2
|- style="background:#cfc;"
| 6
| November 8
| New Jersey
| W 99–86
| Steve Kerr (21)
| Dennis Rodman (12)
| Toni Kukoč (7)
| United Center23,898
| 4–2
|- style="background:#fcc;"
| 7
| November 11
| @ Cleveland
| L 80–101
| Michael Jordan (19)
| Jason Caffey (8)
| Brown & Kerr (5)
| Gund Arena20,562
| 4–3
|- style="background:#fcc;"
| 8
| November 12
| Washington
| L 83–90
| Michael Jordan (28)
| Dennis Rodman (14)
| Harper & Longley (5)
| United Center23,749
| 4–4
|- style="background:#cfc;"
| 9
| November 14
| Charlotte
| W 105–92
| Michael Jordan (28)
| Dennis Rodman (14)
| Michael Jordan (7)
| United Center23,894
| 5–4
|- style="background:#cfc;"
| 10
| November 15
| Cleveland
| W 79–70
| Michael Jordan (27)
| Dennis Rodman (18)
| Toni Kukoč (7)
| United Center23,906
| 6–4
|- style="background:#fcc;"
| 11
| November 20
| @ Phoenix
| L 85–89
| Michael Jordan (30)
| Dennis Rodman (14)
| Ron Harper (5)
| America West Arena19,023
| 6–5
|- style="background:#cfc;"
| 12
| November 21
| @ L.A. Clippers
| W 111–102 (2OT)
| Michael Jordan (49)
| Luc Longley (17)
| Toni Kukoč (6)
| Los Angeles Memorial Sports Arena16,199
| 7–5
|- style="background:#cfc;"
| 13
| November 23
| @ Sacramento
| W 103–88
| Michael Jordan (33)
| Dennis Rodman (14)
| Toni Kukoč (8)
| ARCO Arena17,317
| 8–5
|- style="background:#fcc;"
| 14
| November 25
| @ Seattle
| L 90–91
| Toni Kukoč (30)
| Dennis Rodman (17)
| Harper & Kukoč (6)
| KeyArena17,072
| 8–6
|- style="background:#fcc;"
| 15
| November 28
| @ Indiana
| L 83–94
| Michael Jordan (26)
| Dennis Rodman (11)
| Toni Kukoč (4)
| Market Square Arena16,736
| 8–7
|- style="background:#cfc;"
| 16
| November 29
| @ Washington
| W 88–83
| Michael Jordan (29)
| Dennis Rodman (17)
| Ron Harper (7)
| US Airways Arena18,756
| 9–7

|- style="background:#cfc;"
| 17
| December 3
| @ Boston
| W 97–87
| Michael Jordan (29)
| Dennis Rodman (17)
| Toni Kukoč (11)
| FleetCenter18,624
| 10–7
|- style="background:#cfc;"
| 18
| December 5
| Milwaukee
| W 82–64
| Toni Kukoč (19)
| Dennis Rodman (14)
| Dennis Rodman (5)
| United Center24,041
| 11–7
|- style="background:#cfc;"
| 19
| December 9
| New York
| W 100–82
| Michael Jordan (29)
| 3 players tied (9)
| Harper & Jordan (4)
| United Center24,107
| 12–7
|- style="background:#fcc;"
| 20
| December 10
| @ Orlando
| L 98–106
| Michael Jordan (25)
| Dennis Rodman (16)
| Toni Kukoč (7)
| Orlando Arena17,248
| 12–8
|- style="background:#fcc;"
| 21
| December 12
| @ Charlotte
| L 77–79
| Michael Jordan (28)
| Dennis Rodman (19)
| Toni Kukoč (7)
| Charlotte Coliseum24,042
| 12–9
|- style="background:#cfc;"
| 22
| December 13
| Toronto
| W 97–70
| Ron Harper (20)
| Dennis Rodman (14)
| Toni Kukoč (6)
| United Center23,867
| 13–9
|- style="background:#cfc;"
| 23
| December 15
| Phoenix
| W 111–104
| Michael Jordan (31)
| Dennis Rodman (21)
| Brown & Rodman (6)
| United Center23,888
| 14–9
|- style="background:#cfc;"
| 24
| December 17
| L.A. Lakers
| W 104–83
| Michael Jordan (36)
| Dennis Rodman (14)
| Toni Kukoč (8)
| United Center24,119
| 15–9
|- style="background:#cfc;"
| 25
| December 20
| @ New Jersey
| W 100–92
| Michael Jordan (24)
| Dennis Rodman (24)
| Dennis Rodman (5)
| Continental Airlines Arena20,049
| 16–9
|- style="background:#cfc;"
| 26
| December 23
| L.A. Clippers
| W 94–89
| Michael Jordan (27)
| Dennis Rodman (25)
| 3 players tied (4)
| United Center23,904
| 17–9
|- style="background:#cfc;"
| 27
| December 25
| Miami
| W 90–80
| Michael Jordan (24)
| Dennis Rodman (13)
| Toni Kukoč (5)
| United Center24,182
| 18–9
|- style="background:#cfc;"
| 28
| December 27
| Atlanta
| W 97–90
| Michael Jordan (47)
| Dennis Rodman (29)
| Dennis Rodman (5)
| United Center24,131
| 19–9
|- style="background:#cfc;"
| 29
| December 29
| Dallas
| W 111–105
| Michael Jordan (41)
| Dennis Rodman (27)
| Dennis Rodman (8)
| United Center23,712
| 20–9
|- style="background:#fcc;"
| 30
| December 30
| @ Minnesota
| L 95–99
| Michael Jordan (33)
| Dennis Rodman (13)
| Toni Kukoč (8)
| Target Center20,097
| 20–10

|- style="background:#cfc;"
| 31
| January 2
| Milwaukee
| W 114–100
| Michael Jordan (44)
| Dennis Rodman (21)
| Luc Longley (8)
| United Center23,897
| 21–10
|- style="background:#cfc;"
| 32
| January 3
| @ Detroit
| W 105–96
| Michael Jordan (34)
| Dennis Rodman (18)
| Michael Jordan (9)
| The Palace of Auburn Hills22,076
| 22–10
|- style="background:#cfc;"
| 33
| January 6
| Boston
| W 90–79
| Jordan & Kukoč (19)
| Dennis Rodman (20)
| Toni Kukoč (6)
| United Center23,804
| 23–10
|- style="background:#fcc;"
| 34
| January 7
| @ Miami
| L 72–99
| Michael Jordan (26)
| Dennis Rodman (17)
| Brown, Harper (4)
| Miami Arena15,200
| 23–11
|- style="background:#cfc;"
| 35
| January 9
| @ New York
| W 90–89
| Michael Jordan (44)
| Luc Longley (10)
| Luc Longley (6)
| Madison Square Garden19,763
| 24–11
|- style="background:#cfc;"
| 36
| January 10
| Golden State
| W 87–82
| Michael Jordan (32)
| Dennis Rodman (16)
| Scottie Pippen (5)
| United Center23,902
| 25–11
|- style="background:#cfc;"
| 37
| January 13
| Seattle
| W 101–91
| Michael Jordan (40)
| Dennis Rodman (17)
| Dennis Rodman (6)
| United Center24,112
| 26–11
|- style="background:#fcc;"
| 38
| January 15
| @ Philadelphia
| L 96–106
| Scottie Pippen (22)
| Dennis Rodman (20)
| Harper & Pippen (5)
| CoreStates Center21,104
| 26–12
|- style="background:#cfc;"
| 39
| January 16
| @ Milwaukee
| W 96–86
| Michael Jordan (27)
| Dennis Rodman (12)
| Luc Longley (5)
| Bradley Center18,717
| 27–12
|- style="background:#cfc;"
| 40
| January 18
| Houston
| W 106–100
| Michael Jordan (45)
| Longley & Rodman (5)
| Scottie Pippen (10)
| United Center24,209
| 28–12
|- style="background:#cfc;"
| 41
| January 21
| Charlotte
| W 110–79
| Michael Jordan (33)
| Luc Longley (13)
| Scottie Pippen (7)
| United Center23,967
| 29–12
|- style="background:#cfc;"
| 42
| January 23
| @ New Jersey
| W 100–98 (OT)
| Michael Jordan (32)
| Scottie Pippen (7)
| Kukoč & Pippen (9)
| Continental Airlines Arena20,049
| 30–12
|- style="background:#fcc;"
| 43
| January 25
| Utah
| L 94–101
| Michael Jordan (32)
| Dennis Rodman (14)
| Scottie Pippen (10)
| United Center24,361
| 30–13
|- style="background:#cfc;"
| 44
| January 27
| @ Vancouver
| W 103–85
| Scottie Pippen (29)
| Dennis Rodman (22)
| Pippen & Rodman (6)
| General Motors Place19,193
| 31–13
|- style="background:#cfc;"
| 45
| January 29
| @ Portland
| W 100–87
| Michael Jordan (29)
| Dennis Rodman (20)
| Longley & Pippen (8)
| Rose Garden21,538
| 32–13
|- style="background:#cfc;"
| 46
| January 30
| @ Golden State
| W 87–80
| Scottie Pippen (22)
| Dennis Rodman (22)
| Scottie Pippen (4)
| The Arena in Oakland19,804
| 33–13

|- style="background:#fcc;"
| 47
| February 1
| @ L.A. Lakers
| L 87–112
| Michael Jordan (31)
| Dennis Rodman (15)
| Brown & Pippen (5)
| Great Western Forum17,505
| 33–14
|- style="background:#cfc;"
| 48
| February 2
| @ Denver
| W 111–72
| Scott Burrell (24)
| Dennis Rodman (16)
| Buechler & Caffey (4)
| McNichols Sports Arena17,171
| 34–14
|- style="background:#fcc;"
| 49
| February 4
| @ Utah
| L 93–101
| Michael Jordan (40)
| Luc Longley (11)
| Dennis Rodman (4)
| Delta Center19,911
| 34–15
|- align="center"
|colspan="9" bgcolor="#bbcaff"|All-Star Break
|- style="background:#cfc;"
|- bgcolor="#bbffbb"
|- style="background:#cfc;"
| 50
| February 10
| Toronto
| W 93–86
| Toni Kukoč (21)
| Dennis Rodman (17)
| Scottie Pippen (9)
| United Center23,881
| 35–15
|- style="background:#cfc;"
| 51
| February 11
| @ Charlotte
| W 92–90
| Michael Jordan (29)
| Dennis Rodman (11)
| 3 players tied (6)
| Charlotte Coliseum24,042
| 36–15
|- style="background:#cfc;"
| 52
| February 13
| Atlanta
| W 112–110
| Michael Jordan (37)
| Michael Jordan (7)
| Scottie Pippen (7)
| United Center24,207
| 37–15
|- style="background:#cfc;"
| 53
| February 15
| Detroit
| W 99–90
| Toni Kukoč (22)
| Michael Jordan (12)
| Jordan & Pippen (5)
| United Center24,139
| 38–15
|- style="background:#cfc;"
| 54
| February 17
| Indiana
| W 105–97
| Michael Jordan (27)
| Dennis Rodman (13)
| Michael Jordan (6)
| United Center24,131
| 39–15
|- style="background:#cfc;"
| 55
| February 19
| @ Toronto
| W 123–86
| Scottie Pippen (22)
| Dennis Rodman (19)
| Scottie Pippen (6)
| SkyDome30,172
| 40–15
|- style="background:#cfc;"
| 56
| February 21
| @ Washington
| W 94–88
| Scottie Pippen (23)
| Dennis Rodman (17)
| Toni Kukoč (5)
| MCI Center20,674
| 41–15
|- style="background:#cfc;"
| 57
| February 23
| Cleveland
| W 97–75
| Michael Jordan (17)
| Ron Harper (10)
| Brown & Kukoč (7)
| United Center23,902
| 42–15
|- style="background:#fcc;"
| 58
| February 25
| Portland
| L 101–106
| Michael Jordan (33)
| Dennis Rodman (14)
| Kukoč & Pippen (6)
| United Center23,821
| 42–16
|- style="background:#cfc;"
| 59
| February 28
| Sacramento
| W 109–94
| Scottie Pippen (29)
| Dennis Rodman (18)
| Pippen & Rodman (6)
| United Center23,914
| 43–16

|- style="background:#cfc;"
| 60
| March 3
| Denver
| W 118–90
| Michael Jordan (30)
| Dennis Rodman (17)
| Toni Kukoč (10)
| United Center23,810
| 44–16
|- style="background:#cfc;"
| 61
| March 8
| @ New York
| W 102–89
| Michael Jordan (42)
| Dennis Rodman (20)
| Jordan & Pippen (6)
| Madison Square Garden19,763
| 45–16
|- style="background:#cfc;"
| 62
| March 10
| Miami
| W 106–91
| Michael Jordan (37)
| Dennis Rodman (10)
| Kukoč & Pippen (8)
| United Center24,102
| 46–16
|- style="background:#fcc;"
| 63
| March 12
| @ Dallas
| L 97–104 (OT)
| Michael Jordan (26)
| Dennis Rodman (22)
| Toni Kukoč (6)
| Reunion Arena18,255
| 46–17
|- style="background:#cfc;"
| 64
| March 14
| @ San Antonio
| W 96–86
| Michael Jordan (30)
| Dennis Rodman (16)
| Scottie Pippen (5)
| Alamodome37,492
| 47–17
|- style="background:#cfc;"
| 65
| March 16
| New Jersey
| W 88–72
| Toni Kukoč (21)
| Dennis Rodman (16)
| Kukoč & Rodman (5)
| United Center23,908
| 48–17
|- style="background:#cfc;"
| 66
| March 17
| @ Indiana
| W 90–84
| Michael Jordan (35)
| Dennis Rodman (19)
| Scottie Pippen (5)
| Market Square Arena16,729
| 49–17
|- style="background:#cfc;"
| 67
| March 20
| Vancouver
| W 98–92
| Michael Jordan (24)
| Toni Kukoč (11)
| Ron Harper (4)
| United Center24,023
| 50–17
|- style="background:#cfc;"
| 68
| March 22
| @ Toronto
| W 102–100
| Jordan & Pippen (33)
| Dennis Rodman (18)
| 3 players tied (5)
| SkyDome33,216
| 51–17
|- style="background:#cfc;"
| 69
| March 23
| Boston
| W 111–88
| Scottie Pippen (27)
| Dennis Rodman (14)
| Toni Kukoč (10)
| United Center23,944
| 52–17
|- style="background:#cfc;"
| 70
| March 25
| @ Orlando
| W 85–70
| Scottie Pippen (23)
| Dennis Rodman (18)
| Michael Jordan (8)
| Orlando Arena17,248
| 53–17
|- style="background:#cfc;"
| 71
| March 27
| @ Atlanta
| W 89–74
| Michael Jordan (34)
| Dennis Rodman (15)
| Ron Harper (6)
| Georgia Dome62,046
| 54–17
|- style="background:#cfc;"
| 72
| March 29
| @ Milwaukee
| W 104–87
| Michael Jordan (30)
| Dennis Rodman (17)
| Toni Kukoč (8)
| Bradley Center18,717
| 55–17
|- style="background:#cfc;"
| 73
| March 31
| Detroit
| W 106–101 (OT)
| Scottie Pippen (27)
| Dennis Rodman (18)
| Michael Jordan (8)
| United Center23,942
| 56–17

|- style="background:#cfc;"
| 74
| April 3
| Minnesota
| W 107–93
| Scottie Pippen (27)
| Dennis Rodman (18)
| Michael Jordan (8)
| United Center23,985
| 57–17
|- style="background:#cfc;"
| 75
| April 5
| @ Houston
| W 109–94
| Michael Jordan (40)
| Dennis Rodman (12)
| Pippen & Rodman (8)
| Compaq Center16,285
| 58–17
|- style="background:#cfc;"
| 76
| April 7
| Washington
| W 103–85
| Michael Jordan (30)
| Dennis Rodman (20)
| Scottie Pippen (7)
| United Center23,969
| 59–17
|- style="background:#fcc;"
| 77
| April 9
| @ Cleveland
| L 85–91
| Michael Jordan (29)
| Dennis Rodman (20)
| Scottie Pippen (8)
| Gund Arena20,562
| 59–18
|- style="background:#cfc;"
| 78
| April 11
| Orlando
| W 87–78
| Michael Jordan (37)
| Dennis Rodman (10)
| Pippen & Rodman (6)
| United Center24,104
| 60–18
|- style="background:#fcc;"
| 79
| April 13
| Indiana
| L 105–114
| Scottie Pippen (28)
| Dennis Rodman (9)
| Harper & Rodman (4)
| United Center23,957
| 60–19
|- style="background:#fcc;"
| 80
| April 15
| @ Detroit
| L 79–87
| Michael Jordan (19)
| Dennis Rodman (15)
| Harper & Kukoč (5)
| The Palace of Auburn Hills22,076
| 60–20
|- style="background:#cfc;"
| 81
| April 17
| @ Philadelphia
| W 87–80
| Michael Jordan (24)
| Dennis Rodman (17)
| Scottie Pippen (4)
| CoreStates Center21,305
| 61–20
|- style="background:#cfc;"
| 82
| April 18
| New York
| W 111-109
| Michael Jordan (44)
| Dennis Rodman (8)
| Scottie Pippen (10)
| United Center24,182
| 62–20

Playoffs

|- align="center" bgcolor="#ccffcc"
| 1
| April 24
| New Jersey
| W 96–93 (OT)
| Michael Jordan (39)
| Dennis Rodman (8)
| 3 players tied (5)
| United Center23,844
| 1–0
|- align="center" bgcolor="#ccffcc"
| 2
| April 26
| New Jersey
| W 96–91
| Michael Jordan (32)
| Dennis Rodman (16)
| Burrell & Rodman (4)
| United Center23,844
| 2–0
|- align="center" bgcolor="#ccffcc"
| 3
| April 29
| @ New Jersey
| W 116–101
| Michael Jordan (38)
| Dennis Rodman (17)
| Scottie Pippen (10)
| Continental Airlines Arena19,889
| 3–0

|- align="center" bgcolor="#ccffcc"
| 1
| May 3
| Charlotte
| W 83–70
| Michael Jordan (35)
| Dennis Rodman (14)
| Jordan & Pippen (4)
| United Center23,844
| 1–0
|- align="center" bgcolor="#ffcccc"
| 2
| May 6
| Charlotte
| L 76–78
| Michael Jordan (22)
| Dennis Rodman (18)
| Michael Jordan (6)
| United Center23,844
| 1–1
|- align="center" bgcolor="#ccffcc"
| 3
| May 8
| @ Charlotte
| W 103–89
| Michael Jordan (27)
| Dennis Rodman (17)
| Michael Jordan (6)
| Charlotte Coliseum23,799
| 2–1
|- align="center" bgcolor="#ccffcc"
| 4
| May 10
| @ Charlotte
| W 94–80
| Michael Jordan (31)
| Dennis Rodman (18)
| Scottie Pippen (8)
| Charlotte Coliseum23,799
| 3–1
|- align="center" bgcolor="#ccffcc"
| 5
| May 13
| Charlotte
| W 93–84
| Michael Jordan (33)
| Dennis Rodman (21)
| Longley & Pippen (5)
| United Center23,844
| 4–1

|- align="center" bgcolor="#ccffcc"
| 1
| May 17
| Indiana
| W 85–79
| Michael Jordan (31)
| Dennis Rodman (10)
| Scottie Pippen (7)
| United Center23,844
| 1–0
|- align="center" bgcolor="#ccffcc"
| 2
| May 19
| Indiana
| W 104–98
| Michael Jordan (41)
| Ron Harper (9)
| Jordan & Pippen (5)
| United Center23,844
| 2–0
|- align="center" bgcolor="#ffcccc"
| 3
| May 23
| @ Indiana
| L 105–107
| Michael Jordan (30)
| Dennis Rodman (12)
| Michael Jordan (7)
| Market Square Arena16,576
| 2–1
|- align="center" bgcolor="#ffcccc"
| 4
| May 25
| @ Indiana
| L 94–96
| Michael Jordan (28)
| Dennis Rodman (16)
| Scottie Pippen (10)
| Market Square Arena16,560
| 2–2
|- align="center" bgcolor="#ccffcc"
| 5
| May 27
| Indiana
| W 106–87
| Michael Jordan (29)
| Scottie Pippen (8)
| Kukoč & Pippen (7)
| United Center23,844
| 3–2
|- align="center" bgcolor="#ffcccc"
| 6
| May 29
| @ Indiana
| L 89–92
| Michael Jordan (35)
| Dennis Rodman (12)
| 3 players tied (2)
| Market Square Arena16,566
| 3–3
|- align="center" bgcolor="#ccffcc"
| 7
| May 31
| Indiana
| W 88–83
| Michael Jordan (28)
| Scottie Pippen (12)
| Michael Jordan (8)
| United Center23,844
| 4–3

|- align="center" bgcolor="#ffcccc"
| 1
| June 3
| @ Utah
| L 85–88 (OT)
| Michael Jordan (33)
| Dennis Rodman (10)
| Steve Kerr (5)
| Delta Center19,911
| 0–1
|- align="center" bgcolor="#ccffcc"
| 2
| June 5
| @ Utah
| W 93–88
| Michael Jordan (37)
| Kukoč & Rodman (9)
| Scottie Pippen (4)
| Delta Center19,911
| 1–1
|- align="center" bgcolor="#ccffcc"
| 3
| June 7
| Utah
| W 96–54
| Michael Jordan (24)
| Ron Harper (10)
| Ron Harper (7)
| United Center23,844
| 2–1
|- align="center" bgcolor="#ccffcc"
| 4
| June 10
| Utah
| W 86–82
| Michael Jordan (34)
| Dennis Rodman (14)
| Scottie Pippen (5)
| United Center23,844
| 3–1
|- align="center" bgcolor="#ffcccc"
| 5
| June 12
| Utah
| L 81–83
| Toni Kukoč (30)
| Scottie Pippen (11)
| Scottie Pippen (11)
| United Center23,844
| 3–2
|- align="center" bgcolor="#ccffcc"
| 6
| June 14
| @ Utah
| W 87–86
| Michael Jordan (45)
| Dennis Rodman (8)
| Kukoč & Pippen (4)
| Delta Center19,911
| 4–2

Player stats

Regular season

Postseason

NBA finals

1998 NBA Finals Roster

Series summary
Legend: OT denotes a game decided in overtime

Bulls win series 4-2

Games 1 and 2
This was the first time in the 1990s that the same two teams played each other in two consecutive finals. The Jazz had won both regular season match-ups, and many analysts predicted a hard-fought seven-game series. Predictions of a Jazz championship were strengthened with their game one victory in overtime in Utah. The Bulls would tie the series in game 2 putting together a fourth quarter run to silence the Delta Center and holding on to win 93–88, finally securing their first victory against Utah all season.

Games 3, 4 and 5
The Finals would move to Chicago with control of the series at stake in Game 3. Though anticipation was high, no one could have expected a blow-out of the proportions seen in Game 3. With a 96–54 triumph over Utah, the Bulls would help the Jazz set an embarrassing record for the lowest points scored in Finals history and biggest margin of defeat, while everyone on the Bulls scored. The Jazz would pull themselves together in Game 4 in a better attempt to tie the series, but lost 86–82.

The early Jazz series-lead seemed like a distant memory, a false indication of a tough series as they hit the floor for Game 5 behind 3–1. Chicago fans prepared for the last game they would host with the Jordan-led Bulls of the 1990s. But any notions of a championship at the United Center would be snuffed out when, with 0.8 seconds on the game, Michael Jordan airballed an off-balance 3 to the right of the basket giving the Jazz a narrow 83–81 win. The play might have been for Toni Kukoč to shoot a three. With the series shifting back to Utah with a far more generous 3-2 Bulls advantage, the promise of another Chicago championship was not so certain.

Game 6
The Chicago Bulls had never let a Finals series go to a Game 7. 
  
As they arrived at the Delta Center for Game 6, things didn't look good for the Bulls. Scottie Pippen's back gave out when he dunked the opening basket of the game and he was slowed down and held to just 8 points. The Jazz suffered a bad break when the referees incorrectly nullified a Howard Eisley three-pointer that, replays showed, was clearly released just before the 24-second clock expired. In the 4th quarter, the Bulls closed the gap as Michael Jordan tallied many of his 45 overall points. Then things got worse for Chicago when John Stockton hit a clutch 3 with 41.9 seconds left to give Utah an 86–83 lead as the Delta Center crowd roared happily. Down by 3, the Bulls had one last chance to stay alive. Running perilously low on energy, it would be imperative for Chicago to win the series before the game went into OT, and also for the Bulls to avoid a Game 7 on the road when Scottie Pippen was so badly injured and their entire lineup was exhausted.

After Michael Jordan made a quick layup to cut the Jazz lead to one, the Bulls needed to stop the Jazz from scoring again. When John Stockton passed the ball to Karl Malone, Michael Jordan stole the ball away and dribbled to the front. Guarding him was Bryon Russell, one of the Jazz's best perimeter defenders. Jordan drove inside the 3-point line, executed a quick cross-over, and drilled a 20-ft. jump shot to give the Bulls an 87–86 lead with 5.2 seconds left. After Utah took a timeout, Stockton's 3 hit the rim and bounced away, giving the Bulls their 6th title in 8 years. The famous winning shot has been immortalized in many records, as Jordan completed a perfect sextet: 6 NBA Finals, 6 championships, and 6 NBA Finals MVP trophies.

Awards and honors
 Michael Jordan, All-NBA First Team
 Scottie Pippen, All-NBA Third Team
 Michael Jordan, NBA All-Star Game MVP
 Michael Jordan, NBA MVP
 Michael Jordan, NBA Finals MVP
 Michael Jordan, NBA All-Defensive First Team
 Scottie Pippen, NBA All-Defensive First Team
 Michael Jordan, Favorite Male Athlete
 Chicago Bulls, Favorite Sports Team

NBA All-Star Game
 Michael Jordan, Guard

Transactions

References

 Bulls on Database Basketball
 Bulls on Basketball Reference

 

Chicago Bulls seasons
Chic
Eastern Conference (NBA) championship seasons
NBA championship seasons
Chicago
Chicago